Darussalam Grand Mosque, Palangka Raya is one of the mosques in Central Kalimantan. This grand mosque is located on George Obos Street in the district of Jekan Raya, Palangka Raya. This mosque is situated within the Islamic Center area of Palangka Raya. This grand mosque is also one of the most important icons of the capital city of Central Kalimantan province.

History 
This grand mosque was built in 1984 initiated by the Foundation of Amal Bakti Muslim Pancasila with its traditional roof shape of three layers of four-sided pyramids. Later on 2010, the provincial government of Central Kalimantan intended to build a mosque which would be the grand mosque of the City of Palangka Raya. Therefore, The Darussalam Grand Mosque was renovated in 2011. The renovation process took three years to be complete. Until 2014, the renovation has completed and this mosque was inaugurated by the governor of Central Kalimantan at that time, Mr. Agustin Teras Narang.

Architecture 
This grand mosque can host more 10,000 worshipers in the  prayer area. The architecture of this grand mosque is a mix between postmodernism, Arabic, and local Dayak architecture. The trace of traditional Dayak architecture could be seen from the traditional Dayak-carved shield as the exterior design of the building. Moreover, the traditional Dayak architecture trace could also be seen from the color patterns on the domes of the mosque. This grand mosque has five domes consisted of one main 32-m diameter dome and four secondary domes. To the southwest of the mosque, there is one tall minaret which has 114 meters in height. This grand mosque has also three different floors, the first one which functioned as the management office of the grand mosque and the second & the third floors which fuctioned as the main prayer area.

Gallery

Reference 

Mosques in Indonesia
Palangka Raya